The Brigham Young Monument (or Pioneer Monument) is a bronzed historical monument located on the north sidewalk of the intersection at Main and South Temple Streets of Salt Lake City, Utah. It was erected in honour of pioneer-colonizer, Utah governor, and LDS Church president Brigham Young who led the Mormon pioneers into the Utah Territory in 1847. The base of the twenty-five-foot monument has the bronze figure of an Indian facing east and that of a bearded fur trapper facing west, both of which preceded the Mormon settlers. On the south side is a bronze bas-relief of a pioneer man, woman, and child, while another bronze plaque has a list of the pioneers who arrived in the Salt Lake Valley on July 24, 1847, and their equipment.  

The Brigham Young Monument was first displayed at the Chicago World's Fair in 1893. It stood briefly afterwards on Temple Square and was then transferred centering the intersection of Main and South Temple streets in 1897, where it stood until 1993, when it was moved a few yards north to its present location.

The monument is the work of Cyrus Edwin Dallin.

See also

 Mormon handcart pioneers
 Mormon Trail
 Pioneer Day (Utah)
 Utah...This Is the Place
 Cyrus Dallin Art Museum
 Robbins Memorial Flagstaff

References

External links

1893 sculptures
Bronze sculptures in Utah
Cultural depictions of Brigham Young
Monuments and memorials in Utah
Mormon migration to Utah
Outdoor sculptures in Salt Lake City
Statues in Utah
Sculptures of men in Utah
Statues of presidents
Sculptures of Native Americans
Works by Cyrus Edwin Dallin
Statues of religious leaders
Relocated buildings and structures in Utah
World's Columbian Exposition
World's fair sculptures